Winter Storms (German:Winterstürme) is a 1924 German silent film directed by Otto Rippert.

Cast
 Carl Auen 
 Jean Blatzheim 
 Carla Collin 
 Lilian Robs 
 Hans Adalbert Schlettow

References

External links

1924 films
Films of the Weimar Republic
Films directed by Otto Rippert
German silent feature films
German black-and-white films